Goran Huskić (born February 26, 1992) is a Serbian professional basketball player for CBet Jonava of the Lithuanian Basketball League.

Playing career 
Huskić started his playing career with Radnički Obrenovac of the Second League of Serbia. He also played junior college basketball for one season.

In 2013, he moved to Spain where he played for Gipuzkoa Basket, Peñas Huesca and San Pablo Burgos of Second Spanish League. In 2017–18 season, San Pablo Burgos got promoted to Liga ACB and Huskić made a debut in the first Spanish league. In October 2020, he won the 2019–20 Basketball Champions League with Burgos. Huskić was loaned to RETAbet Bilbao Basket in November 2020.

On July 21, 2021, he has signed with Mitteldeutscher BC of the German Basketball Bundesliga.

Career achievements 
 LEB Oro All-Rising Stars team (2015–16)
 All-LEB Oro team (2016–17)

See also 
 Serbia at the 2019 FIBA Basketball World Cup qualification

References

External links
 Player Profile at eurobasket.com
 Player Profile at realgm.com
 Statistics at basketball-reference.com
 Player Profile at acb.com

1992 births
Living people
Basketball players from Belgrade
CB Miraflores players
CB Peñas Huesca players
Centers (basketball)
Gipuzkoa Basket players
Howard Hawks men's basketball players
KK Radnički Obrenovac players
Liga ACB players
Mitteldeutscher BC players
Serbian expatriate basketball people in Germany
Serbian expatriate basketball people in Spain
Serbian expatriate basketball people in the United States
Serbian men's basketball players